The Osage Nation, a Native American tribe in the United States, is the source of most other terms containing the word "osage".

Osage can also refer to:
 Osage language, a Dhaegin language traditionally spoken by the Osage Nation
 Osage (Unicode block), containing characters from the Osage alphabet
 Osage-orange, Maclura pomifera, a tree of the mulberry family
 Osage Indian murders (1921–1925), a group of murders that took place on the Osage Indian Reservation as whites tried to get control of headrights to oil royalties
 Osage River, a tributary of the Missouri River, entirely contained in Missouri, United States
 Hughes TH-55 Osage U.S. Army helicopter
 USS Osage (1863)
 USS Osage (LSV-3)
 Osage Gallery, an art gallery in Hong Kong

Osage is a part of many placenames, including:

Canada
Osage, Saskatchewan

United States
Osage, Arkansas
Osage, Iowa
Osage, Minnesota
Osage, New Jersey
Osage, Ohio
Osage, Oklahoma (also known as Osage City, Oklahoma)
Osage, West Virginia (near Morgantown, West Virginia)
Osage, Wyoming
Osage Beach, Missouri
Osage Bluff, Missouri
Osage City, Kansas
Osage Mills, Arkansas
Osage County, Kansas
Osage County, Missouri
Osage County, Oklahoma, home of the Osage Indian Reservation 
Osage Township, LaSalle County, Illinois
Osage Township, Mitchell County, Iowa
Osage Township, Becker County, Minnesota
Osage Township, Webster County, Missouri
Fort Osage (Independence, Missouri), a United States Army base built in 1808

Language and nationality disambiguation pages